Sarah Berman née Ostrowsky (1895-1957) was a self-taught visual artist. She immigrated from the Ukraine to the United States as a child with her family. Most likely she was part of the large wave of emigration from the Russian Empire at the turn of the century, an exodus that resulted from job and settling restrictions for Jews. While Sarah earned her living in sweatshops in New York City, she taught herself to paint.  Although her formal artistic training was limited – she attended life classes with the portraitist Robert Henri at the Anarchist Centre in Harlem and had access to a graphics workshop run under the auspices of Works Progress Administration...". Berman's work was included in the 1940 MoMA show American Color Prints Under $10. The show was organized as a vehicle for bringing affordable fine art prints to the general public. Berman's work was "associated with leftist political circles. She was the founder and operator of the “Tea Room” on the premises of Manhattan’s Rand School with its connections to the Socialist Party of America. Berman portrayed a very different side of New York cultural life than many other female modernists of the period.

Career

Style  
Berman painted realistic impressions inspired by her experiences on New York’s Lower East Side with “a directness that is distinctive,” remarked one reviewer. The art critic Henry McBride praised her “untrammelled imagination”, something the art historian Alfred Werner attributed, at least in part, to her own cultural marginality as part of a Jewish community that, during the 1920s and 1930s, “formed a curiously disadvantaged enclave” as “awkward outsiders in New York’s largely Gentile Art Establishment.” The artist worked in other mediums including etching, and lithography. Some of these works can be found in the permanent collections of The Metropolitan Museum of Art and Smithsonian American Art Museum. A critic for the New York Times referenced her painting as being “one of the most interesting painters the Artists’ Gallery has yet shown.

Sarah Berman is cited in a recent Vanity Fair magazine article on the well known film, "Joe Gould's Secret" (2000), an American drama film directed by Stanley Tucci. The screenplay by Howard A. Rodman is based on the magazine article Professor Sea Gull and the book Joe Gould's Secret by Joseph Mitchell. Berman is described in this article as a painter and supportive friend of Gould's, more specifically a sympathetic saviour to Joe Gould.

"...Gould remained a man of the street. He was often dirty, dizzy, and drunk, cold, loused, and hungry. He had no teeth and cadged his meals, eating free ketchup by the spoonful in diners. And when, in the spring of 1944, a painter Gould knew, Sarah Ostrowsky Berman, happened upon him seated on the steps of a tenement on Bleecker Street, with a bad cold and a hangover and sores on his legs, she was heartbroken. Only a few years earlier, the two had had long talks at parties."

References

External links 

20th-century American painters
Emigrants from the Russian Empire to the United States
American women painters
1895 births
1957 deaths
20th-century American women artists
Federal Art Project artists